Nicolás Fonseca (born 19 October 1998) is an Italian footballer who plays as a midfielder for Montevideo Wanderers.

Career

Before the second half of 2021–22, Fonseca signed for Uruguayan side River Plate (Montevideo).

Personal life

He is the son of former Uruguay international Daniel Fonseca.

References

External links
 

1998 births
Living people
Italian footballers
Italian expatriate footballers
Italian people of Uruguayan descent
Association football midfielders
Footballers from Naples
Novara F.C. players
Club Atlético River Plate (Montevideo) players
Montevideo Wanderers F.C. players
Serie C players
Italian expatriate sportspeople in Uruguay
Expatriate footballers in Uruguay